Andrew Richard Booker (born 1976) is a British mathematician who is currently Professor of Pure Mathematics at the University of Bristol.  He is an analytic number theorist known for his work on L-functions of automorphic forms and his contributions to the sums of three cubes problem.

Education
Booker graduated from the University of Virginia in 1998, earning the E.J. McShane Prize as the top undergraduate in mathematics. He completed his doctoral degree at Princeton University in 2003, under the supervision of Peter Sarnak.

Contributions
In the spring of 2019 Booker gained international attention by showing that 33 can be expressed as the sum of three cubes.  At that time 33 and 42 were the only numbers less than 100 for which this problem was open.  Later that year, in joint work with Andrew Sutherland of MIT, he settled the case of 42, as well as answering a 65-year-old question of Mordell by finding a third representation for 3 as the sum of three cubes.  Popular Mechanics cited the result for 42 as one of the top two mathematical breakthroughs of 2019.

Video appearances
Numberphile has produced three YouTube videos related to sums of three cubes in which Andrew Booker is the featured guest:
42 is the new 33
The Mystery of 42 is Solved
3 as a sum of 3 cubes
As of January 2023 these videos had accumulated a total of almost two million views.

Selected publications

References

External links
Andrew Booker's profile at the University of Bristol
Andrew Booker's profile on MathSciNet
Andrew Booker's profile on zbMath
Andrew Booker's profile on Google Scholar
Andrew Booker's preprints posted to arXiv

Living people
21st-century British mathematicians
Number theorists
Princeton University alumni
University of Virginia alumni
Academics of the University of Bristol
1976 births